Apollyon (born as Ole Jørgen Moe) is a black metal/thrash metal multi-instrumentalist, formerly associated with Dødheimsgard and Cadaver, now playing in Aura Noir and also Immortal after its reforming in 2006. He has done guest vocals on the Darkthrone albums Plaguewielder and Sardonic Wrath, and also on Audiopain's EP 1986 (2000). He was a live guitarist for Gorgoroth from 2003 to 2004, and performed at Gorgoroth's now infamous Kraków gig in February 2004. In 2004 Apollyon participated in a live tribute to Quorthon of Bathory at the Hole in the Sky festival in Bergen, Norway. Apollyon played bass on all songs, and also did the vocals on the song Equimanthorn. In addition to Apollyon, the line-up of this tribute band consisted of Bård Faust (ex-Emperor) on drums and Ivar Bjørnson (Enslaved) and Samoth (Emperor) on guitars, as well as guest vocalists Gaahl (Gorgoroth), Abbath (Immortal), Grutle Kjellson (Enslaved), Nocturno Culto (Darkthrone) and Satyr (Satyricon).

Bands

Current
Aura Noir (vocals, guitar, bass, drums)
Two Trains (guitar)

Former
Cadaver (band) (vocals, bass guitar)
Cadaver Inc (vocals, bass guitar)
Dødheimsgard (guitar, vocals, bass, drums)
Immortal (bass guitar)
Lamented Souls (vocals, guitar, drums)
Waklevören (drums, vocals)

Former live/guest/session appearances
Darkthrone
2001 - Plaguewielder (additional vocals on "Command")
2004 - Sardonic Wrath (additional vocals on "Hate is the Law")
2010 - Circle the Wagons (choirs)

Gorgoroth
2008 - Black Mass Kraków 2004 DVD (guitars)

Naer Mataron
2005 - Discipline Manifesto (lead guitars on "Land of Dreams")

Obliteration
2005 - Total Fucking Obliteration EP (backing vocals on tracks 3, 4)

Secht
2006 - Secht (vocals)

Whiskey Ritual
2010 - In Goat We Trust (vocals on "One Million")

Discography

Aura Noir
Two Voices One King (unreleased demo) (1994)
Dreams Like Deserts... (EP) (1995)
Black Thrash Attack (1996)
Deep Tracts of Hell (1998)
Increased Damnation (2000)
The Merciless (2004)
Hades Rise (2010)
Out To Die (2012)
Aura Noire  (2018)

Dødheimsgard
Monumental Possession (1996)
Satanic Art (EP) (1998)
666 International (1999)

Cadaver
Primal (demo) (as Cadaver Inc.) (2000)
Discipline (as Cadaver Inc.) (2001)
Live Inferno (live album) (as Cadaver Inc.) (2002)
Necrosis (2004)

Lamented Souls
Soulstorm (demo) (1993)
Demo (demo) (1995)
Essence of Wounds (7") (2003)
The Origins of Misery (2004)

Gorgoroth
Black Mass Krakow 2004 (DVD) (2008)

Waklevören
Brutal Agenda (2005)
Tiden lager alle sår (2007)

Two Trains
Two Trains (2004)

Darkthrone (guest appearance)
Plaguewielder (2001)
Sardonic Wrath (2004)

Audiopain (guest appearance)
1986 (EP) (2000)

Immortal
All Shall Fall (2009)
The Seventh Date of Blashyrkh (2010)

References

External links

Official Aura Noir website
Official Immortal website
Official Aura Noir MySpace profile
Official Immortal MySpace profile
Official Lamented Souls MySpace profile
Official Waklevören MySpace profile
 Interview at nocturnalcult.com
 Interview at heavymetaltribune.blogspot.com
 

1974 births
Living people
Norwegian heavy metal bass guitarists
Norwegian male bass guitarists
Black metal singers
Norwegian black metal musicians
Norwegian heavy metal drummers
Male drummers
Norwegian heavy metal guitarists
Norwegian multi-instrumentalists
Norwegian rock bass guitarists
Norwegian rock guitarists
Norwegian rock singers
Norwegian songwriters
Death metal musicians
Cadaver (band) members
Aura Noir members
Immortal (band) members
21st-century Norwegian singers
21st-century Norwegian drummers
21st-century Norwegian bass guitarists
21st-century Norwegian male singers